Czernica  is a village in Wrocław County, Lower Silesian Voivodeship, in south-western Poland. It is the seat of the administrative district (gmina) called Gmina Czernica. Prior to 1945 it was in Germany.

The village has a population of 1,000.

Monuments 
 Marian column of 1708.

References

Villages in Wrocław County